Leutwyler is a surname. Notable people with the surname include:

Kim Leutwyler, Australian artist
Matthew Leutwyler (born 1969), American writer, director, and producer

See also 
Leutwiler